Remy Kalsrap (born 20 January 1996) is a Vanuatuan footballer who plays as a defender for Erakor Golden Star in the Port Vila Football League and the Vanuatu national football team. He made his debut for the national team on November 7, 2015 in a 1–1 draw against Fiji.

He has capped at the under-17 and under-20 levels.

References

External links
 

Living people
1996 births
Vanuatuan footballers
Association football defenders
Vanuatu international footballers
Vanuatu under-20 international footballers
Vanuatu youth international footballers
Erakor Golden Star F.C. players
2016 OFC Nations Cup players